One ship and one shore establishment of the Royal Navy have borne the name HMS Corncrake

HMS Corncrake was the name of an RN minelaying converted trawler, lost in the Atlantic in January 1943.
HMS Corncrake was an air station of the Fleet Air Arm, at Ballyhalbert, County Down. It was situated on RAF Ballyhalbert a RAF station, and was paid off in 1946.

References

External links

Royal Navy ship names